Brandun Lee (born April 25, 1999) is an American professional boxer who held the IBO Inter-Continental super lightweight title in 2021. Lee's knockout-to-win ratio stands at 85%.

Early life 
Lee was born and raised in Yuba City, California to a North Korean-born father and a Mexican mother. He lived there for about 12 years and then moved to the Coachella Valley. He attended La Quinta High School, and played soccer and ran track as a youngster. Lee faced racial prejudice growing up because of his Korean descent: he says other people would "stereotype a lot and look at my eyes and think Chinese", and "people thought that because I was Asian that I couldn’t fight. We would come down to Southern California and they would say, “We want the little Chinito” which meant they wanted the “Chinese” kid".

Amateur career 
Lee started boxing at around six years old, and had his first amateur fight at age eight. He won four Junior Golden Gloves Championships, the Junior Silver Gloves three times and the Junior PAL five times. He was due to represent the U.S. in Saint Petersburg, Russia, but his parents refused to let him skip school in order to participate. Lee amassed an impressive amateur record of 181–9.

Professional career 
Lee signed a professional contract with manager Cameron Dunkin in the fall of 2016 and debuted shortly afterward at age 17 the next year while he was still in high school. He has been trained by his father Bobby Lee "since day one". After compiling a perfect 21–0 record, he captured the vacant IBO Inter-Continental super lightweight title on March 10, 2021, when he defeated Samuel Teah (17–3–1) by third-round knockout at the Mohegan Sun Arena in Uncasville, Connecticut.

In his next fight, Lee fought for the first time professionally in his home state of California, against Ezequiel Victor Fernandez (28–4–1) on the undercard of John Riel Casimero vs. Guillermo Rigondeaux on August 14, 2021. Lee made quick work of his opponent, knocking Fernandez down 3 times in the first 100 seconds of the fight. The fight was waved off after the third knockdown, extending Lee's consecutive knockout victory streak to fourteen in a row.

Personal life 
Lee was named after Bruce Lee's son, Brandon Lee, because his father was a fan of the martial artist. He has one older brother, whom he calls his "role model".

Unusually for a professional boxer, Lee is a full-time college student, having obtained an Associates of Arts degree at College of the Desert, before transferring to California State University, San Bernardino with the aim of earning a bachelor’s degree in criminal justice. He has further plans to obtain a master's degree in business.

He is largely a monolingual English speaker, stating that he does not speak Korean. Regarding his Spanish proficiency, he admits that he "can’t carry on a conversation but I can speak some words here and there".

Lee has named Mike Tyson, Felix Trinidad, Floyd Mayweather Jr., Gennady Golovkin and Vasyl Lomachenko as his boxing influences, and is a longtime friend of fellow American boxer Jaron Ennis.

His favorite Korean food is bulgogi.

Professional boxing record

Notes

References

External links 
 

1999 births
Living people
American male boxers
Light-welterweight boxers
Boxers from California
People from Yuba City, California
People from La Quinta, California
American sportspeople of Mexican descent
American sportspeople of Korean descent